Port Richey is a city in Pasco County, Florida, United States. It is a suburban city included in the Tampa-St. Petersburg-Clearwater, Florida Metropolitan Statistical Area.

History
In 1883, Aaron M. Richey arrived from St. Joseph, Missouri, and settled near the mouth of the Pithlachascotee River. He established a post office in his home on July 9, 1884.

Port Richey was incorporated as a municipality in 1925, in response to the incorporation of New Port Richey the previous year. The name Port Richey is older than the name New Port Richey, as the post offices were established in 1884 and 1915, respectively.

Singer Johnny Cash owned a home along the Pithlachascotee River from 1979 until 2002. Cash and his wife June Carter Cash inherited the house from Maybelle Carter after her death, and they sold it in 2002 shortly before their deaths in 2003.

The population of Port Richey has remained small, and proposals to abolish the city have gone before the voters several times.

On February 21, 2019, Mayor Dale Massad was taken into custody by the Florida Department of Law Enforcement with assistance from the Pasco County Sheriff's Office and the local SWAT team on charges of practicing medicine without a license. He also later was charged with two counts of attempted homicide for opening fire on officers as they attempted to serve the warrant. The next day, Governor Ron DeSantis signed an executive order to remove Massad from office. Three weeks later, Acting Mayor Terrence Rowe was arrested for several charges, including obstruction of justice and use of a two-way communication device to facilitate the commission of a crime. The charges were described as an "offshoot" of the charges against Massad. DeSantis removed Rowe from office on March 20, which left the city with no one to serve as mayor. The three remaining members of city council were unable to agree on a replacement.

Geography

Port Richey is located at  (28.274651, –82.723009).

The City of Port Richey is served by the Port Richey Police Dept. and The Port Richey Fire Dept. Ambulance Service is provided by Pasco County Fire-Rescue. There is a hospital within walking distance of the fire department.

Demographics

As of the census of 2000, there were 3,021 people, 1,424 households, and 770 families residing in the city. The racial makeup of the city was 96.13% White, 0.63% African American, 0.60% Native American, 1.09% Asian, 0.07% Pacific Islander, 0.36% from other races, and 1.13% from two or more races. Hispanic or Latino of any race were 2.88% of the population.

There were 1,424 households, out of which 15.7% had children under the age of 18 living with them, 44.1% were married couples living together, 6.4% had a female householder with no husband present, and 45.9% were non-families. 37.4% of all households were made up of individuals, and 15.2% had someone living alone who was 65 years of age or older. The average household size was 2.02 and the average family size was 2.61.

In the city, the population was spread out, with 14.8% under the age of 18, 6.3% from 18 to 24, 25.0% from 25 to 44, 26.7% from 45 to 64, and 27.1% who were 65 years of age or older. The median age was 48 years. For every 100 females, there were 99.5 males. For every 100 females age 18 and over, there were 98.1 males.

The median income for a household in the city was $27,404, and the median income for a family was $40,050. Males had a median income of $30,473 versus $22,139 for females. The per capita income for the city was $20,711. About 9.1% of families and 16.1% of the population were below the poverty line, including 34.6% of those under age 18 and 3.1% of those age 65 or over.

Points of interest

 Gulf View Square, an enclosed shopping mall, located north of Port Richey.

See also
New Port Richey

References

External links
City of Port Richey official site

Cities in Pasco County, Florida
Populated coastal places in Florida on the Gulf of Mexico
Cities in Florida
1925 establishments in Florida
Populated places established in 1925